Lettice is both a given name and a surname. Notable people with the name include:

Given name 
Lettice Boyle, wife of George Goring, Lord Goring
Lettice Bryan (1805–1877), American author
Lettice Cooper (1897–1994), English writer
Lettice Curtis (1915–2014), English woman aviator, flight test engineer, air racing pilot and sportswoman
Lettice Digby, 1st Baroness Offaly (1580–1658), Irish peeress and landowner
Lettice Digby (scientist) (1877–1972), British cytologist, botanist and malacologist
Lettice D'Oyly Walters (1880–1940), English writer
Lettice Fisher (1875–1956), English economist and historian
Lettice Jowitt (1878–1962), English Quaker educationalist
Lettice Knollys (1543–1634), mother of Robert Devereux, 2nd Earl of Essex, Queen Elizabeth I's courtier
Lettice Lee (1731–1776), Colonial American society hostess
Lettice Mary Tredway (1595–1677), English abbess
Lettice Paget, Baroness Paget (1583–1655), English noblewoman born to Sir Henry Knollys and Margaret Cave, wife of William Paget, 4th Baron Paget
Lettice Ramsey (1898–1985), English photographer
Lettice Sandford (1902–1993), draftsman, wood-engraver, corn dolly revivalist and watercolourist from Herefordshire

Surname 

John Lettice (1737–1832), English clergyman, translator, academic, and author

Fictional characters 

 Lettice Protheroe, a character in Agatha Christie's novel The Murder at the Vicarage
 Lettice the Mercy, a tomb-colonist in the game Fallen London

See also
Lettice and Lovage, a 1987 comedic play by Peter Shaffer
Lettuce (disambiguation)
Laetitia (given name), (also Letitia) female given name sometimes shortened to Lettice

English feminine given names